Lester Leroy  Caywood (August 18, 1903 – February 4, 1986) was an American football player from Sapulpa, Oklahoma. Caywood played professionally in the National Football League (NFL) as a guard and tackle.

Career
Caywood made his National Football League debut with the Buffalo Rangers in 1926. Over the next nine season he played for the Cleveland Bulldogs, Cincinnati Reds, St. Louis Gunners, Detroit Wolverines, Brooklyn Dodgers, Pottsville Maroons, Chicago Cardinals and the New York Giants, where he was a part of the Giants 1927 NFL Championship team. He also was a member of the Kansas City Cowboys in 1926, although he never actually played in a game with the team.

References

External links

1903 births
1986 deaths
American football guards
American football tackles
Brooklyn Dodgers (NFL) players
Buffalo Rangers players
Chicago Cardinals players
Cincinnati Reds (NFL) players
Cleveland Bulldogs players
Detroit Wolverines (NFL) players
New York Giants players
Pottsville Maroons players
St. Louis Gunners players
St. John's Red Storm football players
People from Sapulpa, Oklahoma
Players of American football from Oklahoma